Klára Csiszár-Szekeres (born 1 December 1987) is a Hungarian handballer for Érd NK and the Hungarian national team.

She debuted in the national team on 19 November 2009 against the Netherlands.

International honours 
European Championship:
Bronze Medalist: 2012

References

External links

Klára Szekeres career statistics at Worldhandball

1987 births
Living people
People from Békéscsaba
Hungarian female handball players
Békéscsabai Előre NKSE players
Ferencvárosi TC players (women's handball)
Sportspeople from Békés County
21st-century Hungarian women